Bazaar of the Bizarre is a collection of fantasy short stories by American writer Fritz Leiber. It was first published in 1978 by Donald M. Grant, Publisher, Inc. in an edition of 1,350 copies. The stories feature Leiber's characters Fafhrd and the Gray Mouser and originally appeared in the magazine Fantastic. The stories were previously published in book form in the complete collected edition of Fafhrd and Mouser stories in the same order, as the final piece in Swords Against Death and the first two in Swords in the Mist.

Contents
 Introduction
 "Bazaar of the Bizarre"
 "The Cloud of Hate"
 "Lean Times in Lankhmar"

References

External links 

1978 short story collections
Nehwon books
Fantasy short story collections
Short story collections by Fritz Leiber
Donald M. Grant, Publisher books